Sophronia marginella is a moth of the family Gelechiidae. It was described by Toll in 1936. It is found in Ukraine.

References

Moths described in 1936
Sophronia (moth)